France competed at the 1936 Winter Olympics in Garmisch-Partenkirchen, Germany.

Medalists

Alpine skiing

Men

Bobsleigh

Cross-country skiing

Men

Men's 4 x 10 km relay

Ice hockey

Group C
Top two teams advanced to semifinals

Team Roster
Michel Paccard
Jacques Morisson
Jacques Lacarrière
Pierre Claret
Pierre Lorin
Marcel Couttet
Albert Hassler
Guy-Pierre Volpert
Jean-Pierre Hagnauer
Michel Delesalle
Philippe Boyard

References

 Olympic Winter Games 1936, full results by sports-reference.com

Nations at the 1936 Winter Olympics
1936
Olympics, Winter